Terry Wayne Jones (born November 8, 1956) is a former American football defensive tackle in the National Football League (NFL). He played his college football at Alabama under Bear Bryant. He played his entire career from 1978 to 1984 for the Green Bay Packers. His son, also called Terry Jones, played tight end in the NFL for the Baltimore Ravens and the San Francisco 49ers.

He was Senior Associate Strength and Conditioning Coach (Rehab) for the Alabama Crimson Tide football team until his retirement June 1, 2022.

External links
University of Alabama Staff
NFL.com player page

1956 births
Living people
People from Sandersville, Georgia
American football defensive tackles
Alabama Crimson Tide football players
Green Bay Packers players